In atomic physics, the Bohr model or Rutherford–Bohr model of the atom, presented by Niels Bohr and Ernest Rutherford in 1913, consists of a small, dense nucleus surrounded by orbiting electrons. It is analogous to the structure of the Solar System, but with attraction provided by electrostatic force rather than gravity. In the history of atomic physics, it followed, and ultimately replaced, several earlier models, including Joseph Larmor's solar system model (1897), Jean Perrin's model (1901), the cubical model (1902), Hantaro Nagaoka's Saturnian model (1904), the plum pudding model (1904), Arthur Haas's quantum model (1910), the Rutherford model (1911), and John William Nicholson's nuclear quantum model (1912). The improvement over the 1911 Rutherford model mainly concerned the new quantum mechanical interpretation introduced by Haas and Nicholson, but forsaking any attempt to explain radiation according to classical physics.

The model's key success lay in explaining the Rydberg formula for hydrogen's spectral emission lines. While the Rydberg formula had been known experimentally, it did not gain a theoretical basis until the Bohr model was introduced. Not only did the Bohr model explain the reasons for the structure of the Rydberg formula, it also provided a justification for the fundamental physical constants that make up the formula's empirical results.

The Bohr model is a relatively primitive model of the hydrogen atom, compared to the valence shell model. As a theory, it can be derived as a first-order approximation of the hydrogen atom using the broader and much more accurate quantum mechanics and thus may be considered to be an obsolete scientific theory. However, because of its simplicity, and its correct results for selected systems (see below for application), the Bohr model is still commonly taught to introduce students to quantum mechanics or energy level diagrams before moving on to the more accurate, but more complex, valence shell atom. A related quantum model was proposed by Arthur Erich Haas in 1910 but was rejected until the 1911 Solvay Congress where it was thoroughly discussed. The quantum theory of the period between Planck's discovery of the quantum (1900) and the advent of a mature quantum mechanics (1925) is often referred to as the old quantum theory.

Origin 

In the early 20th century, experiments by Ernest Rutherford established that atoms consisted of a diffuse cloud of negatively charged electrons surrounding a small, dense, positively charged nucleus. Given this experimental data, Rutherford naturally considered a planetary model of the atom, the Rutherford model of 1911. This had electrons orbiting a solar nucleus, but involved a technical difficulty: the laws of classical mechanics (i.e. the Larmor formula) predict that the electron will release electromagnetic radiation while orbiting a nucleus. Because the electron would lose energy, it would rapidly spiral inwards, collapsing into the nucleus on a timescale of around 16 picoseconds. Rutherford's atom model is disastrous because it predicts that all atoms are unstable. Also, as the electron spirals inward, the emission would rapidly increase in frequency due to the orbital period becoming shorter, resulting in electromagnetic radiation with a continuous spectrum. However, late 19th-century experiments with electric discharges had shown that atoms will only emit light (that is, electromagnetic radiation) at certain discrete frequencies. By the early twentieth century, it was expected that the atom would account for the spectral lines. In 1897, Lord Rayleigh analyzed the problem. By 1906, Rayleigh said, “the frequencies observed in the spectrum may not be frequencies of disturbance or of oscillation in the ordinary sense at all, but rather form an essential part of the original constitution of the atom as determined by conditions of stability.”

The outline of Bohr's atom came during the proceedings of the first Solvay Conference in 1911 on the subject of Radiation and Quanta, at which Bohr's mentor, Rutherford was present. Max Planck’s lecture ended with this remark: “... atoms or electrons subject to the molecular bond would obey the laws of quantum theory”. Hendrik Lorentz in the discussion of Planck's lecture raised the question of the composition of the atom based on Thomson's model with a great portion of the discussion around the atomic model developed by Arthur Erich Haas. Lorentz explained that Planck's constant could be taken as determining the size of atoms, or that the size of atoms could be taken to determine Planck's constant. Lorentz included comments regarding the emission and absorption of radiation concluding that “A stationary state will be established in which the number of electrons entering their spheres is equal to the number of those leaving them.” In the discussion of what could regulate energy differences between atoms, Max Planck simply stated: “The intermediaries could be the electrons.” The discussions outlined the need for the quantum theory to be included in the atom and the difficulties in an atomic theory. Planck in his talk said explicitly: “In order for an oscillator [molecule or atom] to be able to provide radiation in accordance with the equation, it is necessary to introduce into the laws of its operation, as we have already said at the beginning
of this Report, a particular physical hypothesis which is, on a fundamental point, in contradiction with classical Mechanics, explicitly or tacitly.” Bohr's first paper on his atomic model quotes Planck almost word for word, saying: “Whatever the alteration in the laws of motion of the electrons may be, it seems necessary to introduce in the laws in question a quantity foreign to the classical electrodynamics, i. e. Planck's constant, or as it often is called the elementary quantum of action.” Bohr's footnote at the bottom of the page is to the French translation of the 1911 Solvay Congress proving he patterned his model directly on the proceedings and fundamental principles laid down by Planck, Lorentz, and the quantized Arthur Haas model of the atom which was mentioned seventeen times.  Lorentz ended the discussion of Einstein's talk explaining: “The assumption that this energy must be a multiple of  leads to the following formula, where  is an integer: .” Rutherford could have outlined these points to Bohr or given him a copy of the proceedings since he quoted from them and used them as a reference. In a later interview, Bohr said it was very interesting to hear Rutherford's remarks about the Solvay Congress. But Bohr said, “I saw the actual reports” of the Solvay Congress.

Then in 1912, Bohr came across the John William Nicholson theory of the atom model that quantized angular momentum as h/2. According to a centennial celebration of the Bohr atom in Nature magazine, it was Nicholson who discovered that electrons radiate the spectral lines as they descend towards the nucleus and his theory was both nuclear and quantum. Niels Bohr quoted him in his 1913 paper of the Bohr model of the atom. The importance of the work of Nicholson's nuclear quantum atomic model on Bohr's model has been emphasized by many historians.

Next, Bohr was told by his friend, Hans Hansen, that the Balmer series is calculated using the Balmer formula, an empirical equation discovered by Johann Balmer in 1885 that described wavelengths of some spectral lines of hydrogen. This was further generalized by Johannes Rydberg in 1888 resulting in what is now known as the Rydberg formula.
After this, Bohr declared, “everything became clear”.

To overcome the problems of Rutherford's atom, in 1913 Niels Bohr put forth three postulates that sum up most of his model:

 The electron is able to revolve in certain stable orbits around the nucleus without radiating any energy, contrary to what classical electromagnetism suggests. These stable orbits are called stationary orbits and are attained at certain discrete distances from the nucleus. The electron cannot have any other orbit in between the discrete ones.
The lowest value of n is 1; this gives the smallest possible orbital radius of 0.0529 nm known as the Bohr radius. Once an electron is in this lowest orbit, it can get no closer to the nucleus. Starting from the angular momentum quantum rule as Bohr admits is previously given by Nicholson in his 1912 paper, Bohr was able to calculate the energies of the allowed orbits of the hydrogen atom and other hydrogen-like atoms and ions. These orbits are associated with definite energies and are also called energy shells or energy levels. In these orbits, the electron's acceleration does not result in radiation and energy loss. The Bohr model of an atom was based upon Planck's quantum theory of radiation.
 Electrons can only gain and lose energy by jumping from one allowed orbit to another, absorbing or emitting electromagnetic radiation with a frequency ν determined by the energy difference of the levels according to the Planck relation: , where h is Planck's constant.

Other points are:

 Like Einstein's theory of the photoelectric effect, Bohr's formula assumes that during a quantum jump a discrete amount of energy is radiated. However, unlike Einstein, Bohr stuck to the classical Maxwell theory of the electromagnetic field. Quantization of the electromagnetic field was explained by the discreteness of the atomic energy levels; Bohr did not believe in the existence of photons.
 According to the Maxwell theory the frequency ν of classical radiation is equal to the rotation frequency νrot of the electron in its orbit, with harmonics at integer multiples of this frequency. This result is obtained from the Bohr model for jumps between energy levels En and En−k when k is much smaller than n. These jumps reproduce the frequency of the k-th harmonic of orbit n. For sufficiently large values of n (so-called Rydberg states), the two orbits involved in the emission process have nearly the same rotation frequency, so that the classical orbital frequency is not ambiguous. But for small n (or large k), the radiation frequency has no unambiguous classical interpretation. This marks the birth of the correspondence principle, requiring quantum theory to agree with the classical theory only in the limit of large quantum numbers.
 The Bohr–Kramers–Slater theory (BKS theory) is a failed attempt to extend the Bohr model, which violates the conservation of energy and momentum in quantum jumps, with the conservation laws only holding on average.

Bohr's condition, that the angular momentum is an integer multiple of ħ was later reinterpreted in 1924 by de Broglie as a standing wave condition: the electron is described by a wave and a whole number of wavelengths must fit along the circumference of the electron's orbit:

 

According to de Broglie's hypothesis, matter particles such as the electron behave as waves. The de Broglie wavelength of an electron is

 

which implies that

 

or

 

where  is the angular momentum of the orbiting electron. Writing  for this angular momentum, the previous equation becomes

 

which is Bohr's second postulate.

Bohr described angular momentum of the electron orbit as 1/2h while de Broglie's wavelength of  described h divided by the electron momentum. In 1913, however, Bohr justified his rule by appealing to the correspondence principle, without providing any sort of wave interpretation. In 1913, the wave behavior of matter particles such as the electron was not suspected.

In 1925, a new kind of mechanics was proposed, quantum mechanics, in which Bohr's model of electrons traveling in quantized orbits was extended into a more accurate model of electron motion. The new theory was proposed by Werner Heisenberg. Another form of the same theory, wave mechanics, was discovered by the Austrian physicist Erwin Schrödinger independently, and by different reasoning. Schrödinger employed de Broglie's matter waves, but sought wave solutions of a three-dimensional wave equation describing electrons that were constrained to move about the nucleus of a hydrogen-like atom, by being trapped by the potential of the positive nuclear charge.

Electron energy levels 

The Bohr model gives almost exact results only for a system where two charged points orbit each other at speeds much less than that of light. This not only involves one-electron systems such as the hydrogen atom, singly ionized helium, and doubly ionized lithium, but it includes positronium and Rydberg states of any atom where one electron is far away from everything else. It can be used for K-line X-ray transition calculations if other assumptions are added (see Moseley's law below). In high energy physics, it can be used to calculate the masses of heavy quark mesons.

Calculation of the orbits requires two assumptions.

 Classical mechanics
The electron is held in a circular orbit by electrostatic attraction. The centripetal force is equal to the Coulomb force.

where me is the electron's mass, e is the elementary charge, ke is the Coulomb constant and Z is the atom's atomic number. It is assumed here that the mass of the nucleus is much larger than the electron mass (which is a good assumption). This equation determines the electron's speed at any radius:
 

 It also determines the electron's total energy at any radius:
 

The total energy is negative and inversely proportional to r. This means that it takes energy to pull the orbiting electron away from the proton. For infinite values of r, the energy is zero, corresponding to a motionless electron infinitely far from the proton. The total energy is half the potential energy, the difference being the kinetic energy of the electron.  This is also true for noncircular orbits by the virial theorem.

 A quantum rule

The angular momentum  is an integer multiple of ħ:

Derivation 
If an electron in an atom is moving on an orbit with period T, classically the electromagnetic radiation will repeat itself every orbital period. If the coupling to the electromagnetic field is weak, so that the orbit doesn't decay very much in one cycle, the radiation will be emitted in a pattern which repeats every period, so that the Fourier transform will have frequencies which are only multiples of 1/T. This is the classical radiation law: the frequencies emitted are integer multiples of 1/T.

In quantum mechanics, this emission must be in quanta of light, of frequencies consisting of integer multiples of 1/T, so that classical mechanics is an approximate description at large quantum numbers. This means that the energy level corresponding to a classical orbit of period 1/T must have nearby energy levels which differ in energy by h/T, and they should be equally spaced near that level,

Bohr considered circular orbits. Classically, these orbits must decay to smaller circles when photons are emitted. The level spacing between circular orbits can be calculated with the correspondence formula. For a hydrogen atom, the classical orbits have a period T determined by Kepler's third law to scale as r3/2. The energy scales as 1/r, so the level spacing formula amounts to

It is possible to determine the energy levels by recursively stepping down orbit by orbit, but there is a shortcut.

The energy in terms of the angular momentum is then

Assuming, with Bohr, that quantized values of L are equally spaced, the spacing between neighboring energies is

This is as desired for equally spaced angular momenta. If one kept track of the constants, the spacing would be ħ, so the angular momentum should be an integer multiple of ħ,

This is how Bohr arrived at his model.

Substituting the expression for the velocity gives an equation for r in terms of n:

so that the allowed orbit radius at any n is

The smallest possible value of r in the hydrogen atom is called the Bohr radius and is equal to:
 

The energy of the n-th level for any atom is determined by the radius and quantum number:

An electron in the lowest energy level of hydrogen therefore has about 13.6 eV less energy than a motionless electron infinitely far from the nucleus. The next energy level is −3.4 eV. The third (3) is −1.51 eV, and so on. For larger values of n, these are also the binding energies of a highly excited atom with one electron in a large circular orbit around the rest of the atom. The hydrogen formula also coincides with the Wallis product.

The combination of natural constants in the energy formula is called the Rydberg energy (RE):

This expression is clarified by interpreting it in combinations that form more natural units:
  is the rest mass energy of the electron (511 keV),
  is the fine-structure constant,
 .

Since this derivation is with the assumption that the nucleus is orbited by one electron, we can generalize this result by letting the nucleus have a charge , where Z is the atomic number. This will now give us energy levels for hydrogenic (hydrogen-like) atoms, which can serve as a rough order-of-magnitude approximation of the actual energy levels. So for nuclei with Z protons, the energy levels are (to a rough approximation):
 

The actual energy levels cannot be solved analytically for more than one electron (see n-body problem) because the electrons are not only affected by the nucleus but also interact with each other via the Coulomb Force.

When Z = 1/α, the motion becomes highly relativistic, and Z2 cancels the α2 in R; the orbit energy begins to be comparable to rest energy. Sufficiently large nuclei, if they were stable, would reduce their charge by creating a bound electron from the vacuum, ejecting the positron to infinity. This is the theoretical phenomenon of electromagnetic charge screening which predicts a maximum nuclear charge. Emission of such positrons has been observed in the collisions of heavy ions to create temporary super-heavy nuclei.

The Bohr formula properly uses the reduced mass of electron and proton in all situations, instead of the mass of the electron,

However, these numbers are very nearly the same, due to the much larger mass of the proton, about 1836.1 times the mass of the electron, so that the reduced mass in the system is the mass of the electron multiplied by the constant 1836.1/(1+1836.1) = 0.99946. This fact was historically important in convincing Rutherford of the importance of Bohr's model, for it explained the fact that the frequencies of lines in the spectra for singly ionized helium do not differ from those of hydrogen by a factor of exactly 4, but rather by 4 times the ratio of the reduced mass for the hydrogen vs. the helium systems, which was much closer to the experimental ratio than exactly 4.

For positronium, the formula uses the reduced mass also, but in this case, it is exactly the electron mass divided by 2. For any value of the radius, the electron and the positron are each moving at half the speed around their common center of mass, and each has only one fourth the kinetic energy. The total kinetic energy is half what it would be for a single electron moving around a heavy nucleus.
 (positronium).

Rydberg formula 

The Rydberg formula, which was known empirically before Bohr's formula, is seen in Bohr's theory as describing the energies of transitions or quantum jumps between orbital energy levels. Bohr's formula gives the numerical value of the already-known and measured the Rydberg constant, but in terms of more fundamental constants of nature, including the electron's charge and the Planck constant.

When the electron gets moved from its original energy level to a higher one, it then jumps back each level until it comes to the original position, which results in a photon being emitted. Using the derived formula for the different energy levels of hydrogen one may determine the wavelengths of light that a hydrogen atom can emit.

The energy of a photon emitted by a hydrogen atom is given by the difference of two hydrogen energy levels:
 

Since the energy of a photon is
 
the wavelength of the photon given off is given by
 

In fact, Bohr's derivation of the Rydberg constant, as well as the concomitant agreement of Bohr's formula with experimentally observed spectral lines of the Lyman ( =1), Balmer ( =2), and Paschen ( =3) series, and successful theoretical prediction of other lines not yet observed, was one reason that his model was immediately accepted.

This was established empirically before Bohr presented his model.

Shell model (heavier atoms) 

Bohr's original three papers in 1913 described mainly the electron configuration in lighter elements. Bohr called his electron shells, “rings” in 1913. Atomic orbitals within shells did not exist at the time of his planetary model. Bohr explains in Part 3 of his famous 1913 paper that the maximum electrons in a shell is eight, writing: “We see, further, that a ring of n electrons cannot rotate in a single ring round a nucleus of charge ne unless n < 8.” For smaller atoms, the electron shells would be filled as follows: “rings of electrons will only join together if they contain equal numbers of electrons; and that accordingly the numbers of electrons on inner rings will only be 2, 4, 8”. However, in larger atoms the innermost shell would contain eight electrons, “on the other hand, the periodic system of the elements strongly suggests that already in neon N = 10 an inner ring of eight electrons will occur”. Bohr wrote "From the above we are led to the following possible scheme for the arrangement of the electrons in light atoms:"

In Bohr's third 1913 paper Part III called "Systems Containing Several Nuclei", he says that two atoms form molecules on a symmetrical plane and he reverts to describing hydrogen. The 1913 Bohr model did not discuss higher elements in detail and John William Nicholson was one of the first to prove in 1914 that it couldn't work for lithium, but was an attractive theory for hydrogen and ionized helium.

In 1921, following the work of chemists and others involved in work on the periodic table, Bohr extended the model of hydrogen to give an approximate model for heavier atoms. This gave a physical picture that reproduced many known atomic properties for the first time although these properties were proposed contemporarily with the identical work of chemist Charles Rugeley Bury

Bohr's partner in research during 1914 to 1916 was Walther Kossel who corrected Bohr's work to show that electrons interacted through the outer rings, and Kossel called the rings: “shells.” Irving Langmuir is credited with the first viable arrangement of electrons in shells with only two in the first shell and going up to eight in the next according to the octet rule of 1904, although Kossel had already predicted a maximum of eight per shell in 1916. Heavier atoms have more protons in the nucleus, and more electrons to cancel the charge. Bohr took from these chemists the idea that each discrete orbit could only hold a certain number of electrons. Per Kossel, after that the orbit is full, the next level would have to be used. This gives the atom a shell structure designed by Kossel, Langmuir, and Bury, in which each shell corresponds to a Bohr orbit.

This model is even more approximate than the model of hydrogen, because it treats the electrons in each shell as non-interacting. But the repulsions of electrons are taken into account somewhat by the phenomenon of screening. The electrons in outer orbits do not only orbit the nucleus, but they also move around the inner electrons, so the effective charge Z that they feel is reduced by the number of the electrons in the inner orbit.

For example, the lithium atom has two electrons in the lowest 1s orbit, and these orbit at Z = 2. Each one sees the nuclear charge of Z = 3 minus the screening effect of the other, which crudely reduces the nuclear charge by 1 unit. This means that the innermost electrons orbit at approximately 1/2 the Bohr radius. The outermost electron in lithium orbits at roughly the Bohr radius, since the two inner electrons reduce the nuclear charge by 2. This outer electron should be at nearly one Bohr radius from the nucleus. Because the electrons strongly repel each other, the effective charge description is very approximate; the effective charge Z doesn't usually come out to be an integer. But Moseley's law experimentally probes the innermost pair of electrons, and shows that they do see a nuclear charge of approximately Z − 1, while the outermost electron in an atom or ion with only one electron in the outermost shell orbits a core with effective charge Z − k where k is the total number of electrons in the inner shells.

The shell model was able to qualitatively explain many of the mysterious properties of atoms which became codified in the late 19th century in the periodic table of the elements. One property was the size of atoms, which could be determined approximately by measuring the viscosity of gases and density of pure crystalline solids. Atoms tend to get smaller toward the right in the periodic table, and become much larger at the next line of the table. Atoms to the right of the table tend to gain electrons, while atoms to the left tend to lose them. Every element on the last column of the table is chemically inert (noble gas).

In the shell model, this phenomenon is explained by shell-filling. Successive atoms become smaller because they are filling orbits of the same size, until the orbit is full, at which point the next atom in the table has a loosely bound outer electron, causing it to expand. The first Bohr orbit is filled when it has two electrons, which explains why helium is inert. The second orbit allows eight electrons, and when it is full the atom is neon, again inert. The third orbital contains eight again, except that in the more correct Sommerfeld treatment (reproduced in modern quantum mechanics) there are extra "d" electrons. The third orbit may hold an extra 10 d electrons, but these positions are not filled until a few more orbitals from the next level are filled (filling the n=3 d orbitals produces the 10 transition elements). The irregular filling pattern is an effect of interactions between electrons, which are not taken into account in either the Bohr or Sommerfeld models and which are difficult to calculate even in the modern treatment.

Moseley's law and calculation (K-alpha X-ray emission lines) 
Niels Bohr said in 1962: "You see actually the Rutherford work was not taken seriously. We cannot understand today, but it was not taken seriously at all. There was no mention of it any place. The great change came from Moseley."

In 1913, Henry Moseley found an empirical relationship between the strongest X-ray line emitted by atoms under electron bombardment (then known as the K-alpha line), and their atomic number . Moseley's empiric formula was found to be derivable from Rydberg's formula and later Bohr's formula (Moseley actually mentions only Ernest Rutherford and Antonius Van den Broek in terms of models as these had been published before Moseley's work and Moseley's 1913 paper was published the same month as the first Bohr model paper).

Moseley wrote to Bohr, puzzled about his results, but Bohr was not able to help. At that time, he thought that the postulated innermost "K" shell of electrons should have at least four electrons, not the two which would have neatly explained the result. So Moseley published his results without a theoretical explanation.

It was Walther Kossel in 1914 and in 1916 who explained that in the periodic table new elements would be created as electrons were added to the outer shell. In Kossel's paper, he writes: “This leads to the conclusion that the electrons, which are added further, should be put into concentric rings or shells, on each of which ... only a certain number of electrons—namely, eight in our case—should be arranged. As soon as one ring or shell is completed, a new one has to be started for the next element; the number of electrons, which are most easily accessible, and lie at the outermost periphery, increases again from element to element and, therefore, in the formation of each new shell the chemical periodicity is repeated.” Later, chemist Langmuir realized that the effect was caused by charge screening, with an inner shell containing only 2 electrons. In his 1919 paper, Irving Langmuir postulated the existence of "cells" which could each only contain two electrons each, and these were arranged in "equidistant layers”.

In the Moseley experiment, one of the innermost electrons in the atom is knocked out, leaving a vacancy in the lowest Bohr orbit, which contains a single remaining electron. This vacancy is then filled by an electron from the next orbit, which has n=2. But the n=2 electrons see an effective charge of Z − 1, which is the value appropriate for the charge of the nucleus, when a single electron remains in the lowest Bohr orbit to screen the nuclear charge +Z, and lower it by −1 (due to the electron's negative charge screening the nuclear positive charge). The energy gained by an electron dropping from the second shell to the first gives Moseley's law for K-alpha lines,
 
or
 

Here, Rv = RE/h is the Rydberg constant, in terms of frequency equal to 3.28 x 1015 Hz. For values of Z between 11 and 31 this latter relationship had been empirically derived by Moseley, in a simple (linear) plot of the square root of X-ray frequency against atomic number (however, for silver, Z = 47, the experimentally obtained screening term should be replaced by 0.4). Notwithstanding its restricted validity, Moseley's law not only established the objective meaning of atomic number, but as Bohr noted, it also did more than the Rydberg derivation to establish the validity of the Rutherford/Van den Broek/Bohr nuclear model of the atom, with atomic number (place on the periodic table) standing for whole units of nuclear charge. Van den Broek had published his model in January 1913 showing the periodic table was arranged according to charge while Bohr's atomic model was not published until July 1913.

The K-alpha line of Moseley's time is now known to be a pair of close lines, written as (Kα1 and Kα2) in Siegbahn notation.

Shortcomings 
The Bohr model gives an incorrect value  for the ground state orbital angular momentum: The angular momentum in the true ground state is known to be zero from experiment. Although mental pictures fail somewhat at these levels of scale, an electron in the lowest modern "orbital" with no orbital momentum, may be thought of as not to rotate "around" the nucleus at all, but merely to go tightly around it in an ellipse with zero area (this may be pictured as "back and forth", without striking or interacting with the nucleus). This is only reproduced in a more sophisticated semiclassical treatment like Sommerfeld's. Still, even the most sophisticated semiclassical model fails to explain the fact that the lowest energy state is spherically symmetric – it doesn't point in any particular direction.

Nevertheless, in the modern fully quantum treatment in phase space, the proper deformation (careful full extension) of the semi-classical result adjusts the angular momentum value to the correct effective one. As a consequence, the physical ground state expression is obtained through a shift of the vanishing quantum angular momentum expression, which corresponds to spherical symmetry.

In modern quantum mechanics, the electron in hydrogen is a spherical cloud of probability that grows denser near the nucleus. The rate-constant of probability-decay in hydrogen is equal to the inverse of the Bohr radius, but since Bohr worked with circular orbits, not zero area ellipses, the fact that these two numbers exactly agree is considered a "coincidence". (However, many such coincidental agreements are found between the semiclassical vs. full quantum mechanical treatment of the atom; these include identical energy levels in the hydrogen atom and the derivation of a fine-structure constant, which arises from the relativistic Bohr–Sommerfeld model (see below) and which happens to be equal to an entirely different concept, in full modern quantum mechanics).

The Bohr model also has difficulty with, or else fails to explain:

 Much of the spectra of larger atoms. At best, it can make predictions about the K-alpha and some L-alpha X-ray emission spectra for larger atoms, if two additional ad hoc assumptions are made. Emission spectra for atoms with a single outer-shell electron (atoms in the lithium group) can also be approximately predicted. Also, if the empiric electron–nuclear screening factors for many atoms are known, many other spectral lines can be deduced from the information, in similar atoms of differing elements, via the Ritz–Rydberg combination principles (see Rydberg formula). All these techniques essentially make use of Bohr's Newtonian energy-potential picture of the atom.
 the relative intensities of spectral lines; although in some simple cases, Bohr's formula or modifications of it, was able to provide reasonable estimates (for example, calculations by Kramers for the Stark effect).
 The existence of fine structure and hyperfine structure in spectral lines, which are known to be due to a variety of relativistic and subtle effects, as well as complications from electron spin.
 The Zeeman effect – changes in spectral lines due to external magnetic fields; these are also due to more complicated quantum principles interacting with electron spin and orbital magnetic fields.
 The model also violates the uncertainty principle in that it considers electrons to have known orbits and locations, two things which cannot be measured simultaneously.
 Doublets and triplets appear in the spectra of some atoms as very close pairs of lines. Bohr's model cannot say why some energy levels should be very close together.
 Multi-electron atoms do not have energy levels predicted by the model. It does not work for (neutral) helium.

Refinements 

Several enhancements to the Bohr model were proposed, most notably the Sommerfeld or Bohr–Sommerfeld models, which suggested that electrons travel in elliptical orbits around a nucleus instead of the Bohr model's circular orbits. This model supplemented the quantized angular momentum condition of the Bohr model with an additional radial quantization condition, the Wilson–Sommerfeld quantization condition

 

where pr is the radial momentum canonically conjugate to the coordinate q, which is the radial position, and T is one full orbital period. The integral is the action of action-angle coordinates. This condition, suggested by the correspondence principle, is the only one possible, since the quantum numbers are adiabatic invariants.

The Bohr–Sommerfeld model was fundamentally inconsistent and led to many paradoxes. The magnetic quantum number measured the tilt of the orbital plane relative to the xy plane, and it could only take a few discrete values. This contradicted the obvious fact that an atom could be turned this way and that relative to the coordinates without restriction. The Sommerfeld quantization can be performed in different canonical coordinates and sometimes gives different answers. The incorporation of radiation corrections was difficult, because it required finding action-angle coordinates for a combined radiation/atom system, which is difficult when the radiation is allowed to escape. The whole theory did not extend to non-integrable motions, which meant that many systems could not be treated even in principle. In the end, the model was replaced by the modern quantum-mechanical treatment of the hydrogen atom, which was first given by Wolfgang Pauli in 1925, using Heisenberg's matrix mechanics. The current picture of the hydrogen atom is based on the atomic orbitals of wave mechanics, which Erwin Schrödinger developed in 1926.

However, this is not to say that the Bohr–Sommerfeld model was without its successes. Calculations based on the Bohr–Sommerfeld model were able to accurately explain a number of more complex atomic spectral effects. For example, up to first-order perturbations, the Bohr model and quantum mechanics make the same predictions for the spectral line splitting in the Stark effect. At higher-order perturbations, however, the Bohr model and quantum mechanics differ, and measurements of the Stark effect under high field strengths helped confirm the correctness of quantum mechanics over the Bohr model. The prevailing theory behind this difference lies in the shapes of the orbitals of the electrons, which vary according to the energy state of the electron.

The Bohr–Sommerfeld quantization conditions lead to questions in modern mathematics. Consistent semiclassical quantization condition requires a certain type of structure on the phase space, which places topological limitations on the types of symplectic manifolds which can be quantized. In particular, the symplectic form should be the curvature form of a connection of a Hermitian line bundle, which is called a prequantization.

Bohr also updated his model in 1922, assuming that certain numbers of electrons (for example, 2, 8, and 18) correspond to stable "closed shells".

Model of the chemical bond 

Niels Bohr proposed a model of the atom and a model of the chemical bond. According to his model for a diatomic molecule, the electrons of the atoms of the molecule form a rotating ring whose plane is perpendicular to the axis of the molecule and equidistant from the atomic nuclei. The dynamic equilibrium of the molecular system is achieved through the balance of forces between the forces of attraction of nuclei to the plane of the ring of electrons and the forces of mutual repulsion of the nuclei. The Bohr model of the chemical bond took into account the Coulomb repulsion – the electrons in the ring are at the maximum distance from each other.

See also 

 1913 in science
 Balmer's Constant
 Bohr–Sommerfeld model
 The Franck–Hertz experiment provided early support for the Bohr model.
 Free-fall atomic model
 The inert pair effect is adequately explained by means of the Bohr model.
 Introduction to quantum mechanics
 Theoretical and experimental justification for the Schrödinger equation

References

Footnotes

Primary sources 
 
 
 
 
 
  Reprinted in The Collected Papers of Albert Einstein, A. Engel translator, (1997) Princeton University Press, Princeton. 6 p. 434. (provides an elegant reformulation of the Bohr–Sommerfeld quantization conditions, as well as an important insight into the quantization of non-integrable (chaotic) dynamical systems.)

Further reading 
 
 Reprint: 
 
 
 
 Klaus Hentschel: Elektronenbahnen, Quantensprünge und Spektren, in: Charlotte Bigg & Jochen Hennig (eds.) Atombilder. Ikonografien des Atoms in Wissenschaft und Öffentlichkeit des 20. Jahrhunderts, Göttingen: Wallstein-Verlag 2009, pp. 51–61

External links 
 Standing waves in Bohr’s atomic model An interactive simulation to intuitively explain the quantization condition of standing waves in Bohr's atomic mode

Atomic physics
Foundational quantum physics
Hydrogen physics
Niels Bohr
Old quantum theory
1913 in science